WKTB-CD (channel 47) is a low-power, Class A television station licensed to Norcross, Georgia, United States, broadcasting the Spanish-language Telemundo network to the Atlanta area. It is owned by locally based Gray Television alongside CBS affiliate and company flagship WANF (channel 46), and independent station WPCH-TV (channel 17). WKTB-CD's studios are located on Green River Parkway in Duluth, and its transmitter is located on Goshen Springs Road (near the I-85/SR 140 interchange) just outside Norcross.

The 47.2 signal is rebroadcast in widescreen standard definition on full-power WANF to provide a Telemundo signal to the entire market, using virtual channel 47.1.

History

Early years
On April 2, 1990, John R. Broomall received the construction permit for a new low-power television station licensed to Roswell, Georgia, on channel 67. Broomall sold the permit to the Korean American TV Broadcasting Co. in April 1991.

By 1996, Korean American had added Telemundo programming, which aired for most of the day, alongside Chinese- and Korean-language fare. Korean programming aired from 7 a.m. to 10 a.m. and again from 11 p.m. to 1 a.m., emphasizing local news, alongside local church service broadcasts and South Korean news and entertainment programs.

The Korean programming, known as KTN, went full-time on a cable channel on AT&T Broadband systems in 2001, which increased its output from six hours a day. Programming continued to include imported and local productions. Meanwhile, channel 67 became channel 38, a result of the clearing of channels 60 to 69 for telecommunications use, in 2000, becoming W38CU. The station's coverage area did not reach much of the city of Atlanta, but it did reach areas of Gwinnett County and DeKalb County with significant ethnic populations.

Digital era
Korean American TV obtained a permit to construct W47DN-D as its digital companion channel on channel 47, with a superior technical facility covering much of the metropolitan area. In 2009, W38CU obtained Class A status and became WKTB-CA; this transferred to the digital transmitter in 2011 upon consolidation under one license. In 2009, the station reaffiliated with Telemundo.
In August 2013, a subchannel on full-power WPXA-TV began repeating WKTB-CD's Telemundo feed in standard definition, using virtual channel 47.11. In June 2021, this moved to WSB-TV.

Sale to Gray Television
On February 7, 2022, it was announced that Gray Television would purchase WKTB-CD and sister company Surge Digital Media, an ad agency specializing in multi-cultural clients and services, for $30 million, pending approval of the Federal Communications Commission (FCC); this would make WKTB-CD a sister station to Gray's duopoly of CBS affiliate WGCL-TV (channel 46, now WANF) and independent station WPCH-TV (channel 17). The sale was completed on April 1, and with it, its full-power simulcast moved to WGCL's spectrum, remaining mapped to 47.1.

Newscasts
In 2012, Telemundo Atlanta began offering a full local news service with newscasts at 6 and 11 p.m.; the station had previously produced three daily 90-second news briefs prior to the expansion. A 5:30 p.m. newscast was added in 2015. Telemundo Atlanta's news was originally helmed by local anchor Jorge Buzo, now of WUVC-DT in Raleigh, North Carolina.

Luis Estrada is the anchor of Noticiero Telemundo Atlanta.

Subchannels
The station's digital signal is multiplexed:

The WKTB-CD feed on the WANF multiplex uses channel 47.1.

References

External links
 

Telemundo network affiliates
Low-power television stations in the United States
KTB-CD
Television channels and stations established in 1990
KTB-CD
TeleXitos affiliates
Asian-American culture in Georgia (U.S. state)
Korean-American culture
Korean-language television stations
Gray Television